Nino Diasamidze (born December 4, 1992) is a Georgian acrobatic gymnast. With partners Mariam Gigolashvili and Magda Rusia, Diasamidze competed in the 2014 Acrobatic Gymnastics World Championships.

References

1992 births
Living people
Acrobatic gymnasts from Georgia (country)
Female acrobatic gymnasts